Aleida is a female given name. It, like the Dutch name Alida and their variations - Aleid, Aleide, Aleidis, Aleijd, Aleyda, etc. - is derived from the Germanic Adelheid ("noble person"). The medieval names are often translated to Adelayde or Alice in English.  

Aleida and its variations may refer to:

People

Medieval
Aleid of Cleves (c.1170–c.1238), Countess of Holland, wife of Dirk VII
Aleidis of Leuven (c. 1103 –1151), Brabantian Queen consort of England, wife of Henry I
Aleid van Holland, or Aleida van Avesnes (1228–1284), Dutch regent of Holland
Aleid van Poelgeest (c.1370–1392), Dutch murdered mistress of the Count of Holland
Aleydis van Schaarbeek (1204–1250), Brabantian laysister and mystic

Modern
Aleida Assmann (born 1937), German academic
Aleida Greve (1670 – 1742), Dutch painter
Aleida Guevara (born 1960), Cuban physician and Marxist, Che Guevara's daughter
Aleida Leurink (1682-1755), Dutch writer
Aleida March (born 1937), Che Guevara's Cuban second wife
Aleida Núñez (born 1981), Mexican actress, singer and model
Aleyda Ortiz (born 1980), Puerto Rican actress and beauty pageant
Aleida Mathilda van Keulen (1920–2010), Dutch Resistance member
Aleida Alavez Ruiz (born 1974), Mexican politician
Aleida Wolfsen (1648–1692), Dutch portrait and historical painter

Fictional characters
Aleida Diaz, a character in the Netflix television series, Orange Is the New Black 
 Aleida Rosales, a character in the Apple TV+ series, For All Mankind

Dutch feminine given names